Balimela is a town and a notified area committee in Malkangiri district in the Indian state of Odisha. It has several tribes and culture. Odia is local language here. However, because of multiculturalism people also speak Bengali and Telugu. The name Balimela came into being after Ramayana era. It is believed that Bali was killed by Lord Rama here. Balimela is famous for settlement of Bangla refugees. There are several Bengali settlement villages around Balimela. Balimela is connected with road to Malkangiri, Jeypore and Visakhapatnam. Balimela has a degree college which caters to the need of higher education. Balimela has a Jawahar Navodaya Vidyalaya -2 of malkangiri district, High School and Missionary run English medium school. Balimela has a hospital as well.  On the outskirt of the town there is a beautiful park known as NAC Park. Balimela is also famous for producing electricity. The remaining water after generation of electricity are kept near Surlukunda village area. From here two canals have been bifurcated, one is Gampakonda Canal and the other is Tamasa Canal. Balimela is also known as Orkel because there was an ancient village called Orkel near Balimela. Balimela has one post office, one SBI, one AXIS Bank and one cooperative bank. It is also famous for OHPC Project because of production of electricity. The Balimela NAC is divided into several wards. Balimela  comes under Chitrakonda assembly constituency. The current MLA of Chitrakonda is Purna Chandra Baka.

Geography
It has an average elevation of 418 metres (1371 feet). The weather is good. Balimela is surrounded by Mountains hence prone to rain. In summer season the temperature runs above 45 degree.

Demographics
 India census, Balimela had a population of 11,500. Males constitute 52% of the population and females 48%. Balimela has an average literacy rate of 57%, lower than the national average of 59.5%; with 60% of the males and 40% of females literate. 13% of the population is under 6 years of age. The population has increased these days and as per unofficial sources it is more than 18000 now. Around 90% of people are Hindusin Balimela where as out of the total population 10% are Christian and 1% are Muslim.

References

Cities and towns in Malkangiri district